Willard Miles Jenkins (April 19, 1884 – February 7, 1968) was a Canadian politician. He served in the Legislative Assembly of New Brunswick as member of the Liberal party from 1935 to 1939.

References

1884 births
1968 deaths
20th-century Canadian politicians
New Brunswick Liberal Association MLAs